Simon Rhein (born 18 May 1998) is a German professional footballer who plays as a midfielder for Hansa Rostock.

Career
Rhein made his professional debut for 1. FC Nürnberg in the Bundesliga on 28 October 2018, starting in the home match against Eintracht Frankfurt, which finished as a 1–1 draw.

On 2 September 2019, Rhein was loaned out to Würzburger Kickers until the end of 2019–20 season.

References

External links
 
 

1998 births
Living people
German footballers
Association football midfielders
1. FC Nürnberg II players
1. FC Nürnberg players
Würzburger Kickers players
FC Hansa Rostock players
Bundesliga players
Regionalliga players